The 2004–05 season was the 48th season in RK Zamet’s history. It is their 4th successive season in the 1.HRL, and 28th successive top tier season.

Competitions

Overall

First team squad

Goalkeeper
 12  Ivan Stevanović
 16  Igor Saršon

Wingers
RW
 8  Tadej Široka
 18  Davor Rokavec

LW
 4  Mateo Hrvatin
 20  Marko Erstić 

Line players
 11  Mirjan Horvat
 15  Dalibor Zupčić
 19  Adnan Kamberović
 20  Damir Bogdanović

Back players
LB
 3  Marko Bagarić 
 9  Ivan Ćosić
 10  Jakov Gojun
 14  Tino Černjul

CB
 5  Željko Gulin
 11   Michal Jančo
 17  Jurij Hauha
RB
 2  Davor Šunjić
 7  Milan Uzelac (captain)
 8  Milan Kosanović
 13  Vedran Banić

Technical staff
  President: Petar Bracanović 
  Sports director: Damir Bogdanović (director-player)
  Technical director: Marin Miculinić
  Club Secretary: Daniela Juriša
  Head Coach: Franko Mileta (until 22 Dec 2004)
  Head Coach: Williams Černeka (from 22 Dec 2004)
  Assistant Coach: Williams Černeka 
  Fitness Coach:  Sergio DePrivitellio
  Tehniko: Valter Marković

1. HRL

First phase

Source: Rk-zamet.hr

Matches

Second phase

Matches

Croatian Cup

Matches

References

External links
HRS
Sport.net.hr 
Rk-zamet.hr

RK Zamet seasons
Handball in Croatia